α-Neoendorphin is an endogenous opioid peptide with a decapeptide structure and the amino acid sequence Tyr-Gly-Gly-Phe-Leu-Arg-Lys-Tyr-Pro-Lys.

α-neoendorphin is a neuropeptide. Prodynorphin or Proenkephalin B is its precursor. Researchers and anatomists have not yet studied the distribution of α-neoendorphin in the human in detail. However, some studies have been done which supports the presence of α-neoendorphin immunoreactive fibers throughout the human brainstem. According to a study done by Duque, Ewing, Arturo Mangas, Pablo Salinas, Zaida Díaz-cabiale, José Narváez, and Rafael Coveñas; α-neoendorphin immunoreactive fibers can be found in the caudal part of the solitary nucleus, in the caudal and the gelatinosa parts of the spinal trigeminal nucleus, and only low density was found in the central grey matter of medulla.

See also
 Neoendorphin

References

Opioid peptides